"Fanatica" is a song by German rock band Eisbrecher, released as the second single from their self-titled debut album. It is the first of only three Eisbrecher songs so far that include a line in English ("This Is Deutsch" from Sünde is the second, and "Gothkiller" from Eiszeit is sung entirely in English). The single does not include the "Fanatica Club Mix" available on the self-titled album.

Track listing 
 Fanatica – 3:22
 Angst? - 4:17
 Fanatica (Maxwell S. Club Mix) – 5:17
 Fanatica (Extended Mix by Noel Pix) – 5:26

2003 singles
Eisbrecher songs
2003 songs
Songs written by Noel Pix
Songs written by Alexander Wesselsky